Broken is a 2013 Nigerian drama film written, produced and directed by Bright Wonder Obasi, starring Nse Ikpe Etim, Bimbo Manuel and Kalu Ikeagwu. It received six nominations at the 2013 Nollywood Movies Awards including awards for Best lead actor, Best Supporting actor, Best Supporting Actress, Best Cinematography, Best Make-up and Best Rising star Female.

Plot
The film starts with Samuel Gabriel (Iyke Adiele) falling into the trap of Police-men while trying to sell hard drugs. He tried escaping  but was ambushed by several of them. His interrogation at the police station was aborted when the interrogating officer was being blackmailed by his guardian for violating his fundamental human rights some years ago as a minor, After his release he was informed that his sister Emmanuella (Tehilia Adiele) was alive but with a mental condition and asthma. He visited her at the asylum and after much persuasion and assurance he was eventually allowed to take her home.

Mariam (Nse Ikpe Etim) & Morris Idoko (Bimbo Manuel) are not home and two of their children Cassia and Pamela (Shalom Sharon Bada & Maksat Anpe) are alone with the housemaid (Mary Chukwu). After a brief knock on the day and a prompt response from Anna, Gabriel suddenly entered the house with Emmanuella on his hands, and hurriedly tries to remedy her asthma attack.

Morris got them arrested for intriguing his home on his arrival to the disapproval of his wife. She later revealed to him that Gabriel and Emmanuella were actually her kids from a previous marriage, he however angrily ignored her and slept off. The eccentric nature & emotional pain suffered by Gabriel and Emmanuella created several incidents that made Anna and Pamela to become uncomfortable in the house. These made Morris to prompt his wife to sort out her issues and not allow it affect their matrimonial home.

Mariam told her husband and children that she is the biological mother of Emmanuella and Samuel. To her surprise, Morris confessed to being the biological father of the housemaid Anna (Mary Chukwu), Miriam spoke to Anna about her knowledge and feelings on her dad's rejection and how she was able to create a cordial relationship with her lost kids, she replied that love is what all families needed. Anna passionately reconciled with Morris then advised Mariam to make peace with all her children. Miriam narrates her ordeal from her previous marriage to Emmanuella and Samuel, they were shocked when she mentioned they had a brother. On visiting the orphanage Samuel discovered that his brother has been sold and is in prison. Mariam visits Gabriel Ortega (Kalu Ikeagwu) after 16 years and informs him that his children are residing in her home. Samuel eventually met his brother Eric (Chuks Chyke) in prison where he explained what led to his death sentence.

Cast
Nse Ikpe Etim as Mariam Idoko
Kalu Ikeagwu as Gabriel Ortega
Bimbo Manuel as Morris Idoko
Sydney Diala as Bishop
Iyke Adiele as Samuel Ortega
Chucks Chyke as Eric Ortega

See also
 List of Nigerian films of 2013

References

External links

2013 films
English-language Nigerian films
2013 drama films
Nigerian drama films
2010s English-language films